Rojs Piziks (born February 12, 1971 in Sigulda) is a retired male decathlete and high jumper from Latvia, who competed for his native country at the 1996 Summer Olympics in Atlanta, United States. He set his personal best score (8045 points) in the men's decathlon on June 16, 1996 at a meet in Riga. Piziks is a four-time national champion in the men's decathlon.

Achievements

References

sports-reference

1971 births
Living people
Latvian decathletes
Latvian male high jumpers
Athletes (track and field) at the 1996 Summer Olympics
Olympic athletes of Latvia
People from Sigulda